Cirina butyrospermi is a species of moth of the family Saturniidae described by André Vuillet in 1911.

The caterpillar of C. butyrospermi is eaten as source of protein in West Africa.

References

Species described in 1911
Edible insects
Saturniinae